Pyeongchang United FC, formerly Gwangju Gwangsan FC and Pyeongchang FC until 2014 and 2019 respectively is a South Korean football club based in the city of Pyeongchang. The team currently play of the K4 League, a semi-professional league and the fourth tier of football in South Korea.

History

Founder club, relocation, and disbandment 
Gwangju Gwangsan FC was founded in 2008 based in Gwangju play first season from 2008 until 2014, the team relocated to Pyeongchang and change name to Pyeongchang FC in 2015 until 2019, the team was disbanded in 2019.

Refounded of Pyeongchang United (2021–present) 
On March 5, 2021, it was founded as Pyeongchang United and re-founded as a semi-successor of Pyeongchang FC, which was disbanded in 2019, and will participate in the K4 League from the 2021 season.

Changes in Club Name 
 2008–2014 : Gwangju Gwangsan FC
 2015–2019 : Pyeongchang FC
 2021–present : Pyeongchang United FC

Crest

Current squad

Honours

Domestic competitions

League
K3 League
  Runner-up : (1) 2009

Season by season

As Gwangju Gwangsan FC

As Pyeongchang FC

As Pyeongchang United FC

References

External links 
 Official website

K4 League clubs
Sport in Gangwon Province, South Korea
2007 establishments in South Korea
Pyeongchang County